Bryan King (born 18 April 1947) is an English former professional footballer who played as a goalkeeper for Chelmsford City, Millwall and Coventry City. After his playing career, he worked as a manager for Jerv, Harstad, Tynset and Kongsberg in Norway, and Falkenberg in Sweden.
He later worked as a scout for Tottenham Hotspur, Aston Villa and Everton. He now lives in Kongsberg, Norway.

King worked as a scout for Tottenham Hotspur between 2002 and 2008 and was a scout for Aston Villa before that. On 6 January 2017, he left Everton as Scandinavian scout, after working there since 2008.

Playing career
King was once called up to the England squad. He was a non-playing substitute for England in their match against Portugal on April 3 1974.

References

1947 births
Living people
English footballers
Chelmsford City F.C. players
Millwall F.C. players
Coventry City F.C. players
Tottenham Hotspur F.C. non-playing staff
English expatriate sportspeople in Norway
Expatriate football managers in Norway
People from Bishop's Stortford
People from Kongsberg
Kongsberg IF managers
FK Jerv managers
Falkenbergs FF managers
Association football goalkeepers
English football managers
Aston Villa F.C. non-playing staff
Everton F.C. non-playing staff
Association football scouts